The Wild Trapeze is the debut solo album by Incubus frontman, Brandon Boyd. Boyd has described the album's sound as 

On June 21, 2010, a music video for Brandon's first single, entitled "Runaway Train," was released online.

The album debuted at #33 on the Billboard 200, selling 11,109 copies

Track listing

Personnel
Brandon Boyd - vocals, guitar, drums, bass, timpani, chimes, glockenspiel
Dave Fridmann - production, keyboard
Jon Theodore - drums

External links
Runaway Train official music video

References

Albums produced by Dave Fridmann
2010 debut albums
Brandon Boyd albums
Albums recorded at Tarbox Road Studios